Titanohyrax is an extinct genus of large to very large hyrax from the Eocene and Oligocene. Specimens have been discovered in modern-day Algeria, Tunisia, Egypt and Libya.  Some species, like T. ultimus, are estimated to be as large as the modern rhinoceros.  Titanohyrax species are still poorly known due to their rarity in the fossil record. 

Titanohyrax is unusual among the numerous Paleogene hyracoids by its lophoselenodont teeth (having teeth that are lophodont and selenodont, fully molariform premolars, and relatively high-crowned cheek teeth. This suggests the genus had a folivorous diet.

The genus was first described by in 1922 for the species T. ultimus from the early Oligocene of the Jebel Qatrani Formation, Fayum Depression, Egypt.

See also
 Megalohyrax
 Gigantohyrax
 Largest prehistoric animals

References

Sources
 Fossils (Smithsonian Handbooks) by David Ward (Page 277)

Prehistoric hyraxes
Eocene mammals of Africa
Oligocene mammals of Africa
Prehistoric placental genera
Fossil taxa described in 1922